Vadym Shevchuk (born 21 October 1995) is a Ukrainian professional footballer.

Club career
In 2016, he plays for Belshina Bobruisk.

References

External links 
 
 
 

1995 births
Living people
Footballers from Zaporizhzhia
Ukrainian footballers
Ukrainian expatriate footballers
Expatriate footballers in Belarus
Ukrainian expatriate sportspeople in Belarus
Association football defenders
FC Dynamo Kyiv players
FC Belshina Bobruisk players
FC TSK Simferopol players
Crimean Premier League players